The Black Hills are a mountain range in Lake County, Oregon.  They are located to the immediate south of the community of Christmas Valley; just off of Old Lake Highway.

References 

Mountain ranges of Oregon
Mountain ranges of Lake County, Oregon